Shouchang may refer to:

Shouchang (1095–1101), era name of Emperor Daozong of Liao
Shouchang, Zhejiang, a town in Jiande, Zhejiang, China
Shouchang River, a river in Jiande, Zhejiang, China